Goesan Eum clan was one of the Korean clans. Their Bon-gwan was in Goesan County, North Chungcheong Province. According to the research in 2000, the number of Goesan Eum clan was 2086.  who was a minister of rites (Lǐbu Shilang) began Goesan Eum clan after he came over from China. Goesan Eum clan was separated from Juksan Eum clan. Eum Jeong who passed Imperial examination in 1083 was a founder of Goesan Eum clan.

See also 
 Korean clan names of foreign origin

References

External links 
 

 
Korean clan names of Chinese origin